Gerhard Himmel (born 26 April 1965, in Hanau) is a German former wrestler who competed in the 1988 Summer Olympics.

References

1965 births
Living people
Olympic wrestlers of West Germany
Wrestlers at the 1988 Summer Olympics
German male sport wrestlers
Olympic silver medalists for West Germany
Olympic medalists in wrestling
Medalists at the 1988 Summer Olympics
Sportspeople from Hanau
20th-century German people
21st-century German people